The 2010 Big Ten men's soccer tournament was the 20th edition of the tournament. It determined the Big Ten Conference's automatic berth into the 2010 NCAA Division I Men's Soccer Championship. The tournament was held at Pennsylvania State University in State College, Pennsylvania. The number 3 seeded Michigan defeated the number 4 seeded Penn State in the Big Ten Tournament Championship game 4 to 1 to win their first tournament championship.

Bracket

Schedule

Quarterfinals

Semifinals

Final

See also 
 Big Ten Conference Men's Soccer Tournament

References

External links 
 Big Ten Men's Soccer Championship Central

Big Ten Men's Soccer Tournament
Tournament
Big Ten Men's Soccer Tournament
Big Ten Men's Soccer Tournament